The Le Fort III Osteotomy for oral and maxillofacial surgery, is used to correct generalised growth failure of the midface involving the upper jaw nose and cheek bones (zygomas). The surgical approach and post operative management is similar as for the Le Fort II procedure.

Brow lift procedures may be carried out at the same time as Le Fort II and Le Fort III osteotomies.

See also 
Le Fort fracture of skull

References

Oral and maxillofacial surgery